KONTI Group ceased to exist after the sale of the owner of the Group business in Russia. 

Company "KONTI" is one of the largest manufacturers of confectionery products in Ukraine. It was founded in 1997 and is one of the industry leaders. Kostiantynivka Confectionery Factory is also part of the Company.

The company’s portfolio includes 200 items including sandwich cookies, complex desserts, boxed sweets and sweets sold by weight, sponge cakes, rolls, candy bars, caramel, crackers and cookies.

Leading Brands
KONTI’s key brands include Super Kontik, Bonjour KONTI, TIMI, Amour, BiSKonti and Jack.

LogisticsPowerful logistics allow us to quickly deliver products to all regions of Ukraine.

Export
"KONTI" products are successfully exported to more than 20 countries of the world: Germany, Poland, Latvia, Greece, Iraq, Yemen, Azerbaijan, Georgia, Estonia and many others.

Perfect quality
The company’s safety and quality management system has ISO 9001: 2008 and ISO 22000: 2005 certificates.

References 

Ukrainian brands